The 1981–82 Segunda División was the 33rd season of the Mexican Segunda División. The season started on 15 August 1981 and concluded on 24 July 1982. It was won by Oaxtepec.

It was the last season played by 24 teams, so this time there were five relegations to Segunda División B, a new intermediate category between Segunda and Tercera División.

Changes 
 Atlético Morelia was promoted to Primera División.
 Unión de Curtidores was relegated from Primera División.
 Córdoba was promoted from Tercera División.
 Cachorros León was relegated from Segunda División.
 Atletas Industriales was bought by new owners, the team was relocated in Morelia and renamed as Atlético Valladolid.
 Coyotes Neza was relocated from Ciudad Nezahualcóyotl to Tenancingo.
 Tapatío remained at Uruapan after the team was moved in the 1980–81 season final stage.
 Bachilleres was relocated from Ocotlán to Guadalajara.
 Universidad Veracruzana was relocated to Coatzacoalcos and renamed as Brujas de Coatzacoalcos.

During the season
 Since Week 29, Estado de México was relocated from Toluca to Texcoco.
 Since Week 36, Nuevo Necaxa was relocated from Juan Galindo to Amecameca.

Teams

Group stage

Group 1

Group 2

Group 3

Group 4

Results

Final stage

Group 1

Group 2

Final

References 

1981–82 in Mexican football
Segunda División de México seasons